
Salem (Shalem; , Salḗm) is an ancient Middle Eastern town mentioned in the Bible.

Salem is referenced in the following biblical passages:

 "And Melchizedek king of Salem brought forth bread and wine: and he was the priest of the most high God."
 "In Salem also is his tabernacle, and his dwelling place in Zion."

The name refers to the royal city of Melchizedek and is traditionally identified with Jerusalem. It is also mentioned in Hebrews 7. The deuterocanonical Book of Judith mentions the "valley of Salem".

Possibly a different place is mentioned in Genesis 33:18: "And Jacob came to Shalem, a city of Shechem, which is in the land of Canaan, when he came from Padanaram; and pitched his tent before the city." The town of Salim corresponds to that location. It is also mentioned in the Gospel of John 3:23: "And John also was baptizing in Aenon near to Saleím [], because there was much water there: and they came, and were baptized."

Various towns have been named after Biblical Salem.

References

Christianity in Jerusalem
Geography of Jerusalem
Ancient history of Jerusalem
Torah cities